The Shadow of Your Smile is a studio album by Astrud Gilberto. With arrangements by Don Sebesky, Claus Ogerman, and João Donato, it was released via Verve Records in 1965. It peaked at number 66 on the Billboard 200 chart.

Track listing

Charts

References

External links
 

1965 albums
Astrud Gilberto albums
Verve Records albums
Albums produced by Creed Taylor
Albums arranged by Claus Ogerman
albums arranged by Don Sebesky
Portuguese-language albums